The  is a multi-purpose dam on the main stream Sagami River in Sagamihara, Kanagawa Prefecture on the island of Honshū, Japan.

History
The potential of the Sagami River valley for hydroelectric power development began to be developed in the 1930s, with the growth of population in the Shonan region, and the expansion of industry and electrical consumption in the Yokohama-Kanagawa industrial belt. Plans for a dam on the Sagami River were submitted to the Home Ministry in 1935, but approval was delayed in favor of other projects. Instead, the Kanagawa Prefectural Assembly passed the necessary regulations and secured a special budget to begin work in 1938. After actual construction work did not begin immediately, due to the strong opposition of the 196 families who needed to be relocated from the area to be flooded by the dam. However,  the wartime demands for power and industrial water by the Yokosuka Naval Arsenal and by the Keihin Industrial complex became critical, and General Sadao Araki ordered troops into the area to force compliance with the relocation.

Work on the Sagami Dam began in 1941 by the Kumagai Gumi construction company; however, the advent of World War II delayed completion until 1947.

Design

The Sagami Dam a hollow-core concrete gravity dam. It was designed to provide flood control, and industrial and drinking water to the cities of Yokohama, Kawasaki, Yokosuka and the Shōnan area. The associated Sagami Hydroelectric Power Plant has a rated capacity of 31,000 KW of power . The reservoir created by the dam, Lake Sagami is also a major recreational location for Kanagawa Prefecture.

See also
Lake Sagami

References
Japan Commission on Large Dams. Dams in Japan:Past, Present and Future. CRC Press (2009). 
Takeuchi, Kuniyoshi. Sustainable Reservoir Development and Management. IAHS Press (November 1998).

External links

photo page
official home page (Japanese)

Gravity dams
Dams in Kanagawa Prefecture
Hydroelectric power stations in Japan
Dams completed in 1947